The Piste de Bobsleigh des Pellerins (Pellerins Bobsleigh Track in ) was a bobsleigh track constructed for the 1924 Winter Olympics in Chamonix, France.

Track statistics
The track was 1369.88 metres long with 19 curves and an elevation difference of 156.29 metres. Turns 1-2, 4-6, 8, 10, 12, and 14 have no names attached to them. Average grade for the track was 11.4%.

During the bobsleigh competitions, a total of nine teams from five countries competed. Two teams withdrew after the first run while another team withdrew after the third run. The three medalist teams were from Switzerland (gold), Great Britain (silver), and Belgium (bronze). Bobsleigh speeds reached up to 115 km/h (71.5 mph) during competition.

The track is no longer in use. It was located near the Ligne du téléférique de l'Aiguille du Midi aerial tramway area, near the village of Les Pèlerins.

References

Venues of the 1924 Winter Olympics
Bobsleigh, luge, and skeleton tracks
Defunct sports venues in France
Olympic bobsleigh venues
Sports venues in Haute-Savoie